Ebner is an unincorporated community in Carroll County, Illinois, United States. Ebner is located near the Mississippi River north of Fulton.

References

Unincorporated communities in Carroll County, Illinois
Unincorporated communities in Illinois